An election to South Tipperary County Council took place on 20 June 1985 as part of that year's Irish local elections. 26 councillors were elected from five electoral divisions by PR-STV voting for a six-year term of office.

Results by party

Results by Electoral Area

Cahir

Cashel

Clonmel

Fethard

Tipperary

External links
 irishelectionliterature

1985 Irish local elections
1985